Damaris Gabriela Aguirre Aldaz (born July 25, 1977 in Chihuahua, Chihuahua) is a Mexican former weightlifter. She won a silver medal for the 75 kg class at the 2007 Pan American Games in Rio de Janeiro, Brazil, with a total of 240 kilograms.

Aguirre made her official debut for the 2004 Summer Olympics in Athens, where she competed for the women's heavyweight category (75 kg). She finished only in twelfth place by 7.5 kilograms short of her record from El Salvador's Eva Dimas, with a total of 222.5 kg (100 in the snatch and 122.5 in the clean and jerk).

At the 2008 Summer Olympics in Beijing, Aguirre qualified for the second time in the women's 75 kg class, by obtaining a place from the 2007 World Weightlifting Championships in Chiang Mai, Thailand. Aguirre placed sixth in this event, as she successfully lifted 109 kg in the single-motion snatch, and hoisted 136 kg in the two-part, shoulder-to-overhead clean and jerk, for a total of 245 kg.

Due to doping offences of other athletes found in 2016 she became Olympic bronze medallist from Beijing 2008.

References

External links
NBC 2008 Olympics profile

1977 births
Living people
Olympic weightlifters of Mexico
Weightlifters at the 2004 Summer Olympics
Weightlifters at the 2008 Summer Olympics
Weightlifters at the 2007 Pan American Games
Pan American Games silver medalists for Mexico
People from Chihuahua City
Sportspeople from Chihuahua (state)
Mexican female weightlifters
Pan American Games medalists in weightlifting
Medalists at the 2007 Pan American Games
Olympic medalists in weightlifting
Olympic bronze medalists for Mexico
Medalists at the 2008 Summer Olympics
20th-century Mexican women
21st-century Mexican women